A list of works by, or about, American science fiction and fantasy author Timothy Zahn.

Star Wars universe

Thrawn trilogy
 Heir to the Empire (1991)
 Dark Force Rising (1992)
 The Last Command (1993)

Hand of Thrawn duology
 Specter of the Past (1997)
 Vision of the Future (1998)

Thrawn series
 Thrawn (2017)
 Thrawn: Alliances (2018)
 Thrawn: Treason (2019)

Thrawn Ascendancy
Thrawn Ascendancy: Chaos Rising (2020)
Thrawn Ascendancy: Greater Good (2021)
Thrawn Ascendancy: Lesser Evil (2021)

Other Star Wars novels
 Survivor's Quest (2004)
 Outbound Flight (2006)
 Allegiance (2007)
 Choices of One (2011)
 Scoundrels (2013)

Graphic novels
 Mara Jade: By the Emperor's Hand; a graphic novel with Michael A. Stackpole  (1999)
 Mara Jade: A Night on the Town, comic in Star Wars Tales 1

Short stories

 First Contact: short story in Star Wars Adventure Journal 1, later republished in Tales from the Empire (1994)
 Mist Encounter : short story in Star Wars Adventure Journal 7, later republished in the paperback edition of Outbound Flight (1995)
 Hammertong: short story in Tales from the Mos Eisley Cantina (1995)
 Sleight of Hand: short story in Tales from Jabba's Palace (1996)
 Command Decision: short story in Star Wars Adventure Journal 11 (1996)
 Side Trip: novella with Michael A. Stackpole in Star Wars Adventure Journal 12 and Star Wars Adventure Journal 13, later republished in Tales from the Empire (1997)
 Jade Solitaire: short story intended for the cancelled Star Wars Adventure Journal 17, later published in Tales from the New Republic (1999)
 Crisis of Faith: short story published in Heir to the Empire: The 20th Anniversary Edition (2011)
 Interlude at Darkknell: novella with Michael A. Stackpole, in Tales from the New Republic (1999)
 Fool's Bargain: eBook; also reprinted in the paperback edition of Survivor's Quest (2004)
 Hero of Cartao: short story in Star Wars Insider
 Changing Seasons: short story in Star Wars Insider
 Judge's Call: short story on Del Rey's website.
 Duel: short story / Hasbro tie-in.
 Handoff: short story in Star Wars Gamer
 The Saga Begins: short story in The Darkstryder Campaign (1995)

Other novels

Blackcollar trilogy
The Blackcollar (1983)
The Backlash Mission (1986)
The Judas Solution (2006)

Both The Blackcollar and The Backlash Mission were released in one joint novel titled Blackcollar in 2006.

Cobra series
The three Cobra trilogies are an ongoing series of adventure novels set in a space opera future where "Cobras", augmented supersoldiers, defend colony worlds from the overbearing Dominion of Man and from the alien Troft.

Cobra trilogy
Cobra (1985)
Cobra Strike (1986)
Cobra Bargain (1988)
The first two books were also released in one compilation called Cobras Two in 1992.  A complete compilation was released as the Cobra Trilogy in 2004.

Cobra War trilogy
Cobra Alliance (2009)
Cobra Guardian (2011)
Cobra Gamble (2012)

Cobra Rebellion trilogy
Cobra Slave (2013)
Cobra Outlaw (February 2015)
Cobra Traitor  (January 2018)

Conquerors trilogy
The Conquerors trilogy of novels concerns a failed first contact between humans and aliens that leads to an interstellar war.
Conquerors' Pride (1994)
Conquerors' Heritage (1995)
Conquerors' Legacy (1996)

Icarus series
The Icarus Hunt (1999)
The Icarus Plot (2022)
The Icarus Twin (TBD)
The Icarus Job (TBD)
The Icarus Changeling (TBD)

Manticore Ascendant 
Co-written with David Weber and Thomas Pope, and set in the early days of Weber's Honorverse, circa 1529 to 1543 Post Diaspora. The series focuses on Travis Uriah Long of the Royal Manticoran Navy and the events leading to the discovery of the Manticore Wormhole Junction.
A Call to Duty  (2014, co-author Weber)
A Call to Arms (2015, co-authors Weber and Pope)
A Call to Vengeance (2018, co-authors Weber and Pope)
A Call to Insurrection (February 1, 2022; co-authors Weber and Pope)

Dragonback series
Dragon and Thief (2003)
Dragon and Soldier (2004)
Dragon and Slave (2005)
Dragon and Herdsman (2006)
Dragon and Judge (2007)
Dragon and Liberator (2008)

Terminator Salvation
Terminator Salvation: From the Ashes (2009)
Terminator Salvation: Trial by Fire (2010)

Quadrail or Frank Compton series
Night Train to Rigel (2005)
The Third Lynx (2007)
Odd Girl Out (2008)
The Domino Pattern (2009)
Judgment at Proteus (2012)

Sibyl's War series 
 Pawn (2017)
 Knight (2019)
Queen (2020)

Starcraft series
Starcraft Evolution (2016)

Other novels
A Coming of Age (1984)
Spinneret (1985)
Triplet (1987)
Deadman Switch (1988)
Warhorse (1990)
Angelmass (2001)
Manta's Gift (2002)
The Green and the Gray (2004)
Soulminder (2014)
Cloak (2015)

Comics 
 Star-Lord #1-3 (December 1996 - February 1997)

Short fiction
Collections
Cascade Point and Other Stories (1986)
Time Bomb and Zahndry Others (1988)
Distant Friends and Others (1992)
Star Song and Other Stories (2002)
Pawn's Gambit: And Other Stratagems (2016)
List of stories
 The Dreamsender short story in Analog July 1980, later republished in Cascade Point (1986)
 The Challenge short story in space Gamer December 1980, later republished in Cascade Point (1986)
 The Energy Crisis of 2215 short story in Amazing Stories March 1981, later republished in Cascade Point (1986)
 Hollow Victory short story in Analog March 1981
 The Giftie Gie Us short story in Analog July 20, 1981, later republished in Cascade Point (1986)
 Job Inaction short story in Analog November 1981, later republished in Cascade Point (1986)
 Dragon Pax short story in Regal Science Fiction Fall 1982, later republished in Cascade Point (1986)
 The Shadows of Evening short story in The Magazine of Fantasy and Science Fiction March 1983, later republished in Cascade Point (1986)
 The Final Report on the Lifeline Experiment short story  in Analog May 1983, later republished in Cascade Point (1986)
 The Cassandra short story in Analog November 1983, later republished in Cascade Point (1986)
 Cascade Point short story and Hugo winner  in Analog December 1983, later republished in Cascade Point (1986)
 Return to the Fold short story and Hugo nominee in Analog September 1984, later republished in Cascade Point (1986)
 Ernie short story in Analog September 1979, later republished in Time Bomb and Zahndry Others (1988)
 Reason d'Etre short story in Analog October 1981, later republished in Time Bomb and Zahndry Others (1988)
 The Price of Survival short story in Analog June 22, 1981, later republished in Time Bomb and Zahndry Others (1988)
 Houseguest short story in The Magazine of Fantasy and Science Fiction January 1982, later republished in Time Bomb and Zahndry Others (1988)
 Between a Rock and a High Place short story in Analog July 1982, later republished in Time Bomb and Zahndry Others (1988)
 The Presidents Doll short story in Analog July 1987, later republished in Time Bomb and Zahndry Others (1988)
 Banshee short story in Analog September 1987, later republished in Time Bomb and Zahndry Others (1988)
 Time Bomb short story in New Destinies May 1988, later republished in Time Bomb and Zahndry Others (1988) and Time Traveled Tales vol 1 (2013)
 The Peacemakers short story in There Won't Be War (1991)
 Red Thoughts at Morning short story in Analog April 1981, later republished in Distant Friends and Others (1992)
 Dark Thoughts at Noon short story in Analog December 1982, later republished in Distant Friends and Others (1992)
 Black Thoughts at Midnight short story in Distant Friends and Others (1992)
 Final Solution short story in Analog March 1982, later republished in Distant Friends and Others (1992)
 Pawn's Gambit short story and Hugo nominee in Analog March 29, 1982, later republished in Distant Friends and Others (1992)
 The Peaceful Man short story in The Magazine of Fantasy and Science Fiction September 1982, later republished in Distant Friends and Others (1992)
 Expanded Character short story in Analog September 1983, later republished in Distant Friends and Others (1992)
 The Evidence of Things Not Seen short story in Analog June 1986, later republished in Distant Friends and Others (1992)
 Guardian Angel short story in Far Frontiers VII December 1986, later republished in Distant Friends and Others (1992)
 Point Man short story in New Destinies vol. 1 1987, later republished in Star Song and Other Stories (2002)
 The Broccoli Factor short story in Analog February 1990, later republished in Star Song and Other Stories (2002)
 Hitmen - See Murderers short story in Amazing Stories June 1991, later republished in Star Song and Other Stories (2002)
 The Art of War short story in The Magazine of Fantasy and Science Fiction March 1997, later republished in Star Song and Other Stories (2002)
 The Play's the Thing short story Analog March 1997, later republished in Star Song and Other Stories (2002)
 Star Song short story in Analog July/August 1997, later republished in Star Song and Other Stories (2002)
 Sword's Man: short story in The Space Gamer
 Symmkyn's Edge: short story in The Space Gamer
 Vampire Trap: short story in The Space Gamer
 Fantasy World: short story in The Space Gamer
 When Jonny Comes Marching Home short story (1982) (This was expanded into the first book in the Cobra series)
 Return to the Fold short story and Hugo nominee (1984)
 Teamwork short story  (1984)
 Music Hath Charms short story in Analog, April 1985
 Clean Slate short story in Amazing Stories, January 1989
 Protocol short story in Analog, September 2002
 Old-Boy Network short story in Sol's Children, August 2002
 Proof short story in Amazing Stories, September 2004
 The Ring short story in Pandora's Closet (DAW Books), August 2007
 Trollbridge short story in Spells of the City (DAW Books), December 2009
 With One Stone: Honorverse short story in The Service of the Sword (2003)
 Vampin' Down the Avenue short story in Twilight Zone: 19 Original Stories on the 50th Anniversary (2009)
 A Matter of Trust short story eBook for Heroes Reborn, November 2015
 "Ghost Riders in the Sky" (2020)

Critical studies and reviews of Zahn's work
Soulminder

References

Bibliographies by writer
Bibliographies of American writers
 
Science fiction bibliographies